Sam Parriott is an American drag racer.

Driving a Cadillac-powered gasser named City of Industry (variously a 1953 or 1963 Kurtis), Parriot won several NHRA national gasser titles.

In the 1953 car, he took A/SP (A Production) at Oklahoma City, Oklahoma in 1958 (with a pass of 12.17 seconds at ), AM/SP (A Modified Production) at Detroit Dragway  in 1960   (with a pass of 12.29  seconds at ), and at Indianapolis Raceway Park in 1961 (with a pass of 11.91 seconds at ) and 1962 (with a pass of 12.53 seconds at ).

In the 1963 car, he won the national AAM/SP (A Modified Production supercharged) title at Indianapolis Raceway Park in 1964 with a 10.62/ pass.

Notes

Sources
Davis, Larry. Gasser Wars, North Branch, MN:  Cartech, 2003, pp. 180–8.

Dragster drivers
American racing drivers